Country Ghetto is the third album from the band JJ Grey & Mofro. It was their first to be manufactured under Alligator Records, after JJ Grey & Mofro had left Fog City Records for them. The Gadsden flag is represented on the cover of the album with the words "Don't Tread on Me" on the rear of the booklet.

Track listing

Personnel
JJ Grey - vocals, keys, electric guitar, acoustic guitar, twelve string guitar, harmonica, bass
Daryl Hance - guitar, slide guitar
Adam Scone - organ, organ bass
George Sluppick - drums

2007 albums
Alligator Records albums
JJ Grey & Mofro albums